Rasmus Christiansen (23 May 1885 – 25 September 1964) was a Danish film actor. He appeared in 40 films between 1915 and 1955. He was born in Vejlby, Aarhus, Jutland, Denmark and died in Denmark.

Filmography

Ægteskab og Pigesjov - 1914
Hovmod staar for Fald - 1915
Plimsolleren - 1916
Danserindens Kærlighedsdrøm - 1916
Je' sku' tale med Jør'nsen - 1917
De er splittergale - 1919
David Copperfield - 1922
Vore venners vinter - 1923
Byens Don Juan - 1924
Stamherren - 1925
Dydsdragonen - 1927
Laila - 1929
Vask, videnskab og velvære - 1932
Nyhavn 17 - 1933
Nøddebo Præstegård - 1934
 Flight from the Millions - 1934
Prisoner Number One - 1935
Min kone er husar - 1935
Den kloge mand - 1937
Plat eller krone - 1937
Kongen bød - 1938
Den gamle præst - 1939
Elverhøj (film) - 1939
Sommerglæder - 1940
Niels Pind og hans dreng - 1941
Tordenskjold går i land - 1942
Alle mand på dæk - 1942
Søren Søndervold - 1942
En pige uden lige - 1943
Moster fra Mols - 1943
Spurve under taget - 1944
Lev livet let - 1944
Besættelse - 1944
Når katten er ude - 1947
Røverne fra Rold - 1947
I de lyse nætter - 1948
For frihed og ret - 1949
Susanne - 1950
Fra den gamle købmandsgård - 1951
Rekrut 67 Petersen - 1952
Den gamle mølle på Mols - 1953
Karen, Maren og Mette - 1954
Bruden fra Dragstrup - 1955

External links

Rasmus Christiansen at Det Danske Filminstitut (in Danish)
Rasmus Christiansen at Den Danske Film Database (in Danish)

1885 births
1964 deaths
Danish male film actors
Danish male silent film actors
20th-century Danish male actors
People from Aarhus